Living 2001–2002 is a double live album from Australian jam band John Butler Trio. The album was released in February 2003 and debuted at #6 on the ARIA album charts and went on to achieve platinum sales.

Track listing

Personnel
 John Butler – electrified/acoustic 11 string guitars, vocals and percussion on "Take"
 Rory Quirk – electric bass, double bass and percussion on "Take"
 Jason McGann – drums, percussion, backing vocals
 Andrew Fry – electric bass on "Earthbound Child"; double bass, backing vocals on "Home is Where the Heart Is"

Additional musicians
 Paul Boon – didgeridoo on "Earthbound Child"

Charts

Weekly charts

Year-end charts

Certifications

References

John Butler Trio albums
2004 live albums